The International Music Council (IMC) was created in 1949 as UNESCO's advisory body on matters of music. It is based at UNESCO's headquarters in Paris, France, where it functions as an independent international non-governmental organization. Its primary aim is to facilitate the development and promotion of international music-making.

The IMC currently consists of some 120 members, divided into four categories (National Music Councils, International Music Organisations, Regional Music Organisations, National and specialized organisations in the field of arts and culture). It is represented by regional councils in Europe, Africa, and the Americas. Their task is to develop and support programmes specifically tailored to the needs of the IMC members and partners in their region.

Initiatives and actions

Five Music Rights 
The International Music Council advocates for access to music to all, through a set of values which are at the basis of the action of both the International Music Council and its regional councils. Those core beliefs have been gathered under the name of Five Music Rights.

The Five Music Rights were first proclaimed in Tokyo during the International Music Council's General Assembly of 2001, and have since been promoted by the International Music Council and related bodies, through advocacy activities, programmes and other initiatives (such as the Music Rights Awards and the appointment of the " Music Rights Champions").

The principles contained in the Five Music Rights (originally written in English) have been translated into French, Spanish, Arabic, and Mandarin Chinese.

IMC undertakes many initiatives within the music ecosystem – such as developing projects, organizing conferences, awarding prizes, etc. Projects are international, regional and sometimes local and are often supported by international, intergovernmental and supranational organizations.

International Rostrum of Composers 
One of the IMC's regular activities is the annual International Rostrum of Composers, a forum offering representatives of national broadcasting organisations the opportunity to exchange and publicize works of contemporary classical music.

The IMC UNESCO Music Prize 
The IMC UNESCO Music Prize was awarded from 1975 until 2005 by the International Music Council, as of 1978 in cooperation with UNESCO. The Prize was addressed to both musicians and musical institutions, in alignment with the purposes of the United Nations Charter and UNESCO's Constitution. The Prize was assessed by four categories: composition, musicology, pedagogy, and performance. The last laureate of the IMC UNESCO Music Prize was Mikis Theodorakis.

African Music Development Programme 
The African Music Development Programme, launched in 2014 by the International Music Council, took place in nine African countries. 

The 3-years-long project was implemented with the financial support of the European Union and the technical assistance of the Organisation of African, Caribbean and Pacific States (ACP), and aimed at supporting the music industry through a series of targeted actions.

Advocacy
The main arena for IMC advocacy is UNESCO, specifically the 1980 Recommendation concerning the Status of the Artist, the 2003 Convention for the Safeguarding of the Intangible Cultural Heritage and the 2005 Convention on the Protection and Promotion of the Diversity of Cultural Expressions.

Some advocacy actions are carried out in alliance with other international organisations such as the #Culture2030Goal campaign for the inclusion of culture among the Sustainable Development Goals.

International Music Day 
The International Music Day was initiated in 1975 by Yehudi Menuhin, former president of the IMC. It is celebrated worldwide on October 1.

IMC presidents 

 Alfons Karabauda (2019–present), Sweden
 Emily Achieng’ Akuno (2017–2019), Kenya
 Paul Dujardin (2013–2017), Belgium
 Frans de Ruiter (1998–2001) (2009–2013), Netherlands
 Richard Letts (2005–2009), Australia
 Kifah Fakhouri (2001–2005), Jordan
 Jordi Roch (1994–1997), Spain
 Eskil Hemberg (1992–1993), Sweden
 Lupwishi Mbuyamba (1988–1991), Zaire
 Marlos Nobre (1986–1987), Brazil
 Gottfried Scholz (1984–1985), Austria
 Barry S. Brook (1982–1983), United States
 Frank Callaway (1980–1981), Australia
 John Peter Lee Roberts (1978–1979), Canada
 Yehudi Menuhin (1969–1975), United States
 Narayana Menon (1967–1968) (1976–1977), India
 Vladimir Fédorov (1965–1966), France
 Mario Labroca (1959–1964), Italy
 Domingo Santa Cruz (1957–1958), Chile
 Steuart Wilson (1954–1956), United Kingdom
 Roland Manuel (1950–1953), France

See also
 International Council for Traditional Music

References

External links 
 The IMC's website

 
International music organizations
UNESCO
Musical groups established in 1949